The Aleutian cackling goose (Branta hutchinsii leucopareia) is a small subspecies of the cackling goose averaging  in weight.  It was one of 122 species of animals, birds, and fish first documented for science by the Lewis and Clark Expedition (Corps of Discovery).

Taxonomy
It was formerly thought to be a subspecies of the Canada goose, as Branta canadensis leucopareia. The Bering cackling goose, a related population/subspecies, lived on the Komandorski and Kuril Islands. This population was not markedly distinct from the Aleutian one, and is debated as to the validity of the subspecies, as B. h. asiatica. By about 1920 or so (last seen either in 1914 or 1929), the birds went extinct from predation by humans and Arctic foxes.

Description
The Aleutian cackling goose has the typical black head and neck, white cheek patches, grayish brown back and wings, white rump, black tail feathers, legs, and feet of the species. The cheek patches are usually separated by a black line under the throat and the breast is a pale grayish-brown color, although a small number of lighter- and darker-breasted birds occur. The westernmost population did not appreciably differ in color, except that the neck ring was always very wide and white in the few attested specimens.

Similar in appearance is the small cackling goose (B. h. minima), which is smaller in size and has a dark breast color with a purplish or brownish cast, whereas Taverner's cackling goose (B. h. taverneri) is larger and has a lighter breast color. Both B. h. minima and B. h. taverneri sometimes have white neck rings, but these are usually narrow or indistinct.

Conservation
The primary threat to the Aleutian cackling goose has been the Arctic fox, introduced to the Aleutian Islands by Russian fur traders between 1836 and 1930. By 1963, the breeding range of the goose was restricted to Buldir Island, and the Aleutian cackling goose was listed by the U.S. Department of the Interior as endangered in 1967. Since then, the Aleutian cackling goose has made a comeback, and it was removed from the United States Fish and Wildlife Service list of endangered mammals and birds in 2001.

Breeding
Aleutian cackling geese typically arrive in California in mid-October each year. The majority of the population goes right to its primary wintering areas in the Central Valley. However, since 2002, a relatively small (1500-5000) number of geese spend fall and winter on the northern coast.  Around late December, the geese wintering in the Central Valley begin moving north, and by mid-February, most of the Aleutian cackling goose population is located in northwestern California until they depart for the Aleutian Islands in mid-April.  As of 2004, Humboldt County began receiving the majority of Aleutian cackling geese on the northwestern coast from January through April.

See also
San Joaquin River National Wildlife Refuge

References

External links 
 U.S. Fish and Wildlife Service - Aleutian Canada goose
 Aleutian Canada goose taxonomy

Branta
Geese
Migratory birds (Western Hemisphere)
Natural history of the Central Valley (California)